Reality shifting is a term popularized in internet culture in 2018, primarily on YouTube, for the spiritual practice of "transferring" or "shifting" one's awareness to a fictional universe or a parallel universe. The practice is often confused with astral projection and lucid dreaming, and there is overlap in the methods and outcomes of both. Practitioners explain the phenomenon as possible due to multiverse theory, but also describe it to be a spiritual practice involving exploration of deeper consciousness.

Description 
The process typically involves, but is not limited to, relaxation, visualisation, and affirmations, similar to the process of meditation or self-hypnosis. It is debated on what the "key" is to shifting, however all that is needed is the individual intending to shift. 

The early concept of reality shifting in 2020 explains that the experience is typically said to be similar to astral projection and manifestation. 
While astral projection claims to explore the astral plane, shifters claim one's awareness becomes aware towards a alternate self. Shifters often tie in the idea of a higher self and deeper levels of consciousness. Similar shifting like/dimension traveling can be seen way back with yogi's gaining Siddhi where it was claimed higher advanced yogi's could dimension travel and perform supernatural powers.

Criticism 
Reality shifting has been criticized to be a form of escapism. A therapist with expertise in anomalous experiences has noted that most cases are safe. However, mental health treatment is recommended for anyone experiencing "anything that created fear for them, or challenged their belief system regarding what we could refer to as ‘consensual reality’"

See also 
 Altered state of consciousness
 Astral projection
 Lucid dream
 Multiverse
 Quantum jump method
 Reincarnation
 Siddhi
 Tulpa
 Vision (spirituality)

References 

Concepts in metaphysics
Internet memes
2020s fads and trends
2020s in Internet culture
Harry Potter fandom
Multiverse